Tiku Talsania (born 7 June 1954) is an Indian actor, who works in the Bollywood industry. Apart from acting in films and television serials, he also performs as a freelance theatre artist, working for Gujarati theatre.

Career

Television
Tiku has acted in a number of television serials starting with Yeh Jo Hai Zindagi in 1984, followed by hit TV serials in 1990s like Ye Duniya Ghazab Ki, Zamana Badal Gaya and Ek Se Badh Kar Ek.

He acted in many successful serials until the very recent Uttaran. He was last seen on the SAB TV's Sitcom Sajan Re Phir Jhooth Mat Bolo.

Films
Tiku started his Bollywood career with Rajeev Mehra's Pyaar Ke Do Pal in 1986. He continued to play his role as comedian in movies such as Dil Hai Ke Manta Nahin, Umar 55 Ki Dil Bachpan Ka, Bol Radha Bol, Andaz Apna Apna and Mr. Bechara from 1991 to 1996. Breaking from his comedian roles, he donned the cap of a serious character in the movie Waqt Hamara Hai in 1993.

He then acted in a number of commercially successful movies such as Ishq in 1997, Jodi No.1 in 2001 and up until Partner in 2007. He received critical acclaim for his role in Sanjay Leela Bhansali's Devdas. Tiku, who played the role of the protagonist Devdas's caretaker Dharamdas, said that he was confident that his role would get noticed.

Talsania continued to work in films such as Dhamaal and Special 26 with minor roles, as having primary focus on television serials.

Personal life
Talsania married Deepti, with whom he has two children, a son, Rohan Talsania and a daughter, actress Shikha Talsania, who has acted in films like Veere Di Wedding, Coolie No. 1 and ''I Hate Luv Storys.

Filmography

See also
 Talsana, ancestral village of Talsania

References

External links

Living people
Male actors from Mumbai
Male actors in Hindi television
Male actors in Hindi cinema
20th-century Indian male actors
21st-century Indian male actors
1954 births